Albert Agapit Pothier (July 31, 1862 – December 31, 1931) was a Canadian political figure in Nova Scotia. He represented Yarmouth County in the Nova Scotia House of Assembly from 1894 to 1897 as a Liberal-Conservative member.

Early life
He was born in Wedgeport, Nova Scotia, the son of Amand Agapit Pothier and Elizabeth Boudreau.

Personal life
He married Jeanne DeViller in 1919.

References
 A Directory of the Members of the Legislative Assembly of Nova Scotia, 1758-1958, Public Archives of Nova Scotia (1958)

Progressive Conservative Association of Nova Scotia MLAs
People from Yarmouth County
Acadian people
1862 births
1931 deaths